Cardiocladius is a genus of non-biting midges in the subfamily Orthocladiinae of the bloodworm family (Chironomidae).

Chironomidae
Taxa named by Jean-Jacques Kieffer
Nematocera genera